This is a list of Spanish football transfers for the 2006–07 Segunda División season. Transfers are only allowed in limited transfer windows in summer and winter.

Deportivo Alavés
In:
  Juan Epitié - Signed From CD Castellón
 Angel - Signed From Ciudad de Murcia
 Wellington Paulista - Signed From Santos FC
 Casar - Signed From Racing de Santander
 Brandan - Signed From Instituto Atlético Central Córdoba
 Gentil - Signed From Palmeiras
 Mateo - Signed From Recreativo de Huelva
 Toni Moral - Signed From Celta de Vigo

Out:
 Gabriel Gomez - On Loan To Osasuna B
 Ian Uranga - On Loan To Barakaldo CF
 Wesley Lopes - On Loan To Grasshopper Club Zürich
 Francisco Alberoni - On Loan To UD Las Palmas
 Pape Thiaw  - On Loan To Lorca Deportiva CF
 Josu Sarriegi - Transferred To Athletic de Bilbao
 Juanito - Transferred To Real Sociedad
  Rodolfo Bodipo - Transferred To Deportivo de La Coruña
 Franco Costanzo - Transferred To FC Basel
 Bernardo - On Loan To CD Tenerife
 Poli - Transferred To Recreativo de Huelva
 Nené - Transferred To Celta de Vigo
 Blagoy Georgiev - Transferred To Red Star Belgrade
 Antonio Pacheco - Return To Albacete Balompié
 Henry Antchouet - On Loan To AEL 1964
 Mauricio Pellegrino - Retired

Albacete Balompié
In:
 José Zahinos - On Loan From Atlético Madrid
 Antonio Calle - Signed From Recreativo de Huelva
 Álvaro Cámara - Signed From Hércules CF
 Noguerol - Signed From Elche CF
 Kike - Signed From Benidorm CD
 Peña - Signed From FC Barcelona B
 Sanz - Signed From Racing de Ferrol
 César Cortés - Signed From CD Universidad Católica
  Biagini - Signed From Sporting de Gijón
 Diego Alegre - Signed From Ciudad de Murcia
 José Javier Barkero - Signed From Real Sociedad
 Gorka Azkorra  - Signed From Athletic de Bilbao
 Héctor Bueno  - Signed From Real Murcia
 Valbuena - On Loan From Real Zaragoza

Out:
 Nicolás Nuñez - On Loan To CD Everton de Viña del Mar
 Juanlu - Return To Real Betis
 Mingo - Transferred To Gimnàstic de Tarragona
 Paco Peña - Transferred To Real Murcia
 Álvaro Rubio - Transferred To Real Valladolid
 Basti - Transferred To CD San Fernando
 Luismi - Transferred To UE Lleida
 Aranda - Return To Sevilla FC
 Corona - Return To Real Zaragoza
 Raúl Molina - Return To Rayo Vallecano
 Garrido - Return To Valencia CF
 Mikel - Transferred To Alicante CF
 Sergio Santamaria - Transferred To UE Sant Andreu
 Pablo García - On Loan To Orihuela CF
 David Pirri - Transferred To Gimnàstic de Tarragona
 Mario Bermejo - Transferred To UD Almería
 Catalá - Transferred To Lorca Deportiva CF
 Antonio Pacheco - Transferred To Club de Gimnasia y Esgrima La Plata

UD Almería
In:
 Rodri - On Loan From Deportivo de La Coruña
 Westerveld - Signed From Portsmouth F.C.
 Cabrera - Signed From Pontevedra CF
 Bruno Saltor - Signed From UE Lleida
  de Palmas - Signed From Racing de Ferrol
 Mané - Signed From Ciudad de Murcia
 Mairata - Signed From SD Eibar
 Alberto - Signed From UD Las Palmas
 Mario Bermejo - Signed From Albacete Balompié
 Corona - On Loan From Real Zaragoza
 Gorka Larrea - On Loan From Real Sociedad

Out:
 Antonio Velamazán - Transferred To CE L'Hospitalet
 Carlos Sanchez - Return To Real Madrid Castilla
 Cervián - Transferred To UE Sant Andreu
 Jonathan Soriano  - Return To RCD Espanyol
 Manolo - Transferred To Levante UD
 Ross Cruse - Transferred To De4tevo
 Jaime Ramos - Transferred To Écija Balompié
 Luna - Transferred To Écija Balompié
 Martin Vellisca - Transferred To Logroñés CF
 Raul Lozano - Transferred To Orihuela CF
 Marc Francolí - Transferred To Águilas CF
 Muley - On Loan To CD Vera de Almería
 Pelegrina - Transferred To Águilas CF
 Barreto - On Loan To Cerro Porteño
 Ricardo Varela - Released
 Miguel Angel Soria López - Released
 Constantin Gâlcă - Released

Cádiz CFIn: Abel Buades - Signed From Gimnàstic de Tarragona
 Neru - Signed From Racing de Santander
 Pablo Hernández  - On Loan From Valencia CF
 Miguel - Return From CD Castellón
 Oscar De Paula  - Signed From Real Sociedad
 Nano - Signed From Getafe CF
 Sergio Rodriguez - Signed From UE Lleida
 Cesar - Signed From SD Eibar
 Velazquez - Return From Lorca Deportiva CFOut: Sergio Rodríguez - On Loan To UE Lleida
 Ezequiel Arana - On Loan To Racing Club Portuense
 Raul Navas  - On Loan To CD Tenerife
 De la Cuesta - On Loan To Real Valladolid
 Varela - Transferred To Ciudad de Murcia
 De Gomar - On Loan To AD Ceuta
  Benjamín - Return To Real Betis
  Estoyanoff - Return To Valencia CF
 Mario Silva - Transferred To Boavista F.C.
 Mirosavljevic - Transferred To FK Partizan
  Berizzo - Released

CD CastellónIn: Antonio López - Signed From Sevilla FC
 Gustavo Oberman - On Loan From Argentinos Juniors
 Imanol Agirretxe  - On Loan From Real Sociedad
 Nakor - Signed From UE Lleida
 Txiki - Signed From Córdoba CF
 Carlos Sánchez - Signed From Real Madrid Castilla
  Dani Pendín - Signed From Xerez CD
 Baigorri - Return From Alicante CF
 Natalio - Return From FC Cartagena
 Aurelio - Signed From Xerez CD
 Ibon Gutiérrez] - Signed From Athletic de BilbaoOut:  Juan Epitié - Transferred To Deportivo Alavés
 Mauricio Romero - Transferred To Atlético Bucaramanga
 Miguel - Return To Cádiz CF
 Torrecilla - Transferred To Ciudad de Murcia
 Raúl Sánchez - Transferred To CD Tenerife
 Jonan García  - Transferred To Ciudad de Murcia
 Zafra - Transferred To Orihuela CF
 Segovia - Transferred To Mérida UD
 Pardo - Transferred To UDA Gramenet
 Kenji Fukuda - Transferred To CD Numancia
 Marqués - Transferred To Atlético Madrid B
 José Mari - Transferred To CE Sabadell FC

Ciudad de MurciaIn: Thiago Schumacher  - On Loan From Udinese Calcio
 Rubén Martín - Signed From Albacete Balompié
 Daniel Fragoso - Signed From FC Barcelona B
 Torrecilla - Signed From CD Castellón
 Varela - Signed From Cádiz CF
 Gaizka Saizar - Signed From Levante B
 Xabi Jiménez - On Loan From Recreativo de Huelva
 Ceballos - Signed From Levante UD
 Borja Criado - Signed From Espanyol BOut: Jonan García  - Transferred To Aris Thessaloniki F.C.
 Miku - Return To Valencia B
 Carlos Saura - On Loan To CD Eldense
 Ángel - Transferred To Deportivo Alavés
 Diego Alegre - Transferred To Albacete Balompié
 Piti - Return To Real Zaragoza
 Raúl Pérez - Transferred To Terrassa FC
 Daniel González - Transferred To Córdoba CF
 Raúl Medina - Return To Atlético Madrid
 Paco Esteban - Return To Málaga CF
 Mané - Transferred To UD Almería
 Sergio Torres - Transferred To CD Tenerife
 Kome - Return To RCD Mallorca

Polideportivo EjidoIn:  Jonathan Soriano - On Loan From RCD Espanyol
  Ortiz - On Loan From Atlético Madrid
  Usero - Signed From Málaga CF
  Quero - Signed From AD Alcorcón
  Mikel Rico  - Signed From UB Conquense
  Manolo - On Loan From FC Barcelona B
  Arano - Signed From Racing Club de Avellaneda
  Éger - Signed From Debreceni VSC
  Robusté - On Loan From RCD EspanyolOut:  Éger - Return To Debreceni VSC
  Oscar Antequera - Transferred To FC Cartagena
  Keko - Transferred To UE Lleida
  Marcos Navas - Return To Sevilla B
  Llorens - Transferred To Rayo Vallecano
  Kiko - Transferred To Lorca Deportiva CF
  Velasco - Transferred To S.S. Reyes

Elche CFIn: Douglas Rodrigues - On Loan From FC Chiasso
 Fernando Fajardo - Signed From Fenix de Montevideo
 Fabián Coelho - Signed From Club Nacional de Football
  Bouchard - Signed From Racing de Ferrol
 Chispa - On Loan From Valencia CF
  Lukasiewicz - Signed From Polonia Warszawa
 Óscar Díaz - Signed From Real Madrid Castilla
 Miguel Cedrón - Signed From CD Numancia
  Gastón Casas - Signed From Recreativo de Huelva
 Manolo Pérez - Signed From Hércules CFOut: Philippe Toledo - On Loan To Levante B
 Noguerol - Transferred To Albacete Balompié
 Nino - Transferred To Levante UD
 Quique Medina - Retired
 Sergio Aragoneses - Transferred To Hércules CF
 Txiki - Transferred To UD Las Palmas
 Unanua - Transferred To Alicante CF
 Quesada - On Loan To Real Jaén
 Luis Gil - Transferred To CD Tenerife

Sporting de GijónIn: Barral - Signed From Real Madrid Castilla
 Diego Castro - Signed From Málaga B
 Andreu - Signed From Málaga B
 Samuel San Jose - On Loan From Racing de Santander
 Congo - Signed From Levante UDOut Pablo Alvarez - Transferred To Deportivo de La Coruña
 Juan Prendes - Transferred To Gimnàstic de Tarragona
  Biagini - Transferred To Albacete Balompié
 Pablo Lago - Transferred To CD Numancia
 Miguel Carmena - Transferred To Racing de Ferrol
  Calandria - Transferred To Hércules CF
 Dorado - Transferred To RCD Mallorca
  Jeffrey Hoogervorst - Transferred To Real Madrid Castilla
 Enguix - Transferred To Rayo Vallecano
 Alejandro Garcia - On Loan To Gimnástica de Torrelavega
 Moises Blanco - On Loan To CF Fuenlabrada
 Jose Angel - On Loan To UD Puertollano

Hércules CFIn: Ismael Falcón - On Loan From Atlético Madrid
 Carmelo - On Loan From Levante UD
 Julio Irrazábal - Signed From Club Nacional
 Líder Mármol - Signed From Club Guaraní
 Xisco Nadal - On Loan From Villarreal CF
 Piti - Signed From Real Zaragoza
 Sergio Aragoneses - Signed From Elche CF
 Graff - Signed From CD Numancia
 Ariel Montenegro - Signed From CD Numancia
 Juanlu Hens - Signed From UE Lleida
 Mantecón - Signed From Alicante CF
 De los Santos - Signed From RCD Mallorca
 Kossi Agassa - Signed From FC Metz
 Calandria - Signed From Sporting de Gijón
 Diego Mateo - Signed From San Lorenzo de Almagro
 Ignacio Benítez - Signed From Recreativo de Huelva
 Tote - Signed From Real Valladolid
 David Rangel - Signed From UE LleidaOut: Ignacio Benítez - On Loan To Rayo Vallecano
 Aarón Galindo - On Loan To Grasshopper Club Zürich
 Rolando Schiavi - Transferred To Grêmio Foot-Ball Porto Alegrense
 Lupidio - Transferred To Benidorm CD
 Álvaro Cámara - Transferred To Albacete Balompié
 Miguel de las Cuevas - Transferred To Atlético Madrid
 Julián Palacios - Transferred To CE Mataró
 Carlitos - Released
 Toché - Return To Atlético Madrid
 Dani Tortolero - Transferred To UD Salamanca
 Sisi - Transferred To Real Valladolid
 Sergio Martínez - On Loan To FC Jove Español San Vicente
 Manolo Pérez - Transferred To Elche CF
 Vicente Verdejo - Transferred To UD Vecindario
 Jimmy Schmidt - Transferred To Central Español
 Dani Navarrete - Transferred To Terrassa FC
 Kiko Ratón - Transferred To Orihuela CF

Málaga CFIn: Ivan Rosado - Signed From CA Osasuna
  Gabriel Schürrer - Signed From Olympiacos
 Calleja - Signed From Villarreal CF
 Sandro - Signed From Levante UD
 Jesule - Signed From Levante UD
 O.J. Morales - Signed From Real Valladolid
 Jonathan Valle - On Loan From Racing de Santander
 Stevan Stošić - Signed From OFK Beograd
  Bratislav Ristić - Signed From FC Metalurh DonetskOut: Francis Duran - Transferred To Liverpool
 Paco Esteban - Transferred To Polideportivo Ejido
 Salva Ballesta  - On Loan To Levante UD
 César Navas - On Loan To Gimnàstic de Tarragona
 Nacho - Transferred To Getafe CF
 Juan Rodríguez - Transferred To Deportivo de La Coruña
 Antonio López - Return To Sevilla FC
 Alexis - Transferred To Getafe CF
  Duda - Transferred To Sevilla FC
 Gerardo - Transferred To Real Sociedad
 Jorge Pina - Transferred To UD Salamanca
  Litos - Transferred To Académica
 Diego Castro - Transferred To Sporting de Gijón
 Fernando Sanz - New President
 Ricardo Bóvio - Transferred To Panathinaikos FC
 Calatayud - Transferred To Racing de Santander
 González-Vigil - Transferred To Zulte-Waregem

CD NumanciaIn: Gorka Brit - Signed From CA Osasuna
 Sietes - Signed From Watford F.C.
 Fran Moreno  - On Loan From CA Osasuna
 Baio - Signed From Tirsense
 Sergio Ortega - Signed From Racing B
 Juanra - Signed From Levante B
 Javier Tarantino  - On Loan From Athletic de Bilbao
 Fukuda - Signed From CD Castellón
 Béranger - Signed From Racing de Ferrol
 Pablo Lago - Signed From Sporting de Gijón
 Felipe Guréndez  - Signed From Athletic de Bilbao
 Boris - Signed From Real Sociedad
 Bolo - Signed From Gimnàstic de Tarragona
 Julio Alvarez - Signed From Real Murcia
 Pulido - Signed From Real MurciaOut Dwight Pezzarossi - Transferred To Deportivo Marquense
 Mario Martínez - On Loan To Zamora CF
 Pablo Niño - Return To Real Betis
 Ibon Gutiérrez  - Return To Athletic de Bilbao
 Gorka Azkorra  - Return To Athletic de Bilbao
  Patricio Graff - Transferred To Hércules CF
  Ariel Montenegro - Transferred To Hércules CF
 Juan Ochoa - Transferred To Real Murcia
 Antonio José Gonzalez - Transferred To Córdoba CF
 Jordi Navas - Transferred To UE Sant Andreu
 Julio Pineda - Transferred To Córdoba CF
 Antonio Tomillo - Transferred To CD Villanueva
 Miguel Cedron - Transferred To Elche CF
 Angel Perez - Transferred To CF Palencia
 Juanpa - Transferred To Lorca Deportiva CF
 Luis Tevenet - Transferred To UE Lleida
 Hamilton Ricard - Transferred To Danubio F.C.
 José Yanguas - Transferred To CD Alfaro

UD Las PalmasIn: Francisco Alberoni - On Loan From Deportivo Alavés
 Roberto Losada  - Signed From Real Valladolid
 Nacho González - Signed From Arsenal de Sarandí
 Txiki - Signed From Elche CF
 Viyuela - Signed From UD Vecindario
 Miguel Cobas - Signed From Racing de Ferrol
 Castillo - On Loan From Real Sociedad B
 Santamaría - Signed From CA Osasuna
 Nacho Garro - On Loan From Real Murcia
 Tomi - Signed From CD Tenerife
 Roberto Trashorras - Signed From CD NumanciaOut: Goran Maric - Return To Celta de Vigo B
 David Rodríguez - Return To Atlético Madrid B
 Curro - Transferred To CD Villanueva
 Alberto - Transferred To UD Almería
 Javi Ortega - On Loan To Castillo CF
 Alejandro Suárez - Transferred To Universidad de Las Palmas CF
 Mario Martínez - Return To CD Numancia
 Jaime Pérez - Transferred To Castillo CF

Lorca DeportivaIn: Julio Barroso - Signed From RC Avellaneda
 Santiago Ladino - Signed From CA Vélez Sársfield
 Capi - On Loan From Real Murcia
 Pape Thiaw  - On Loan From Deportivo Alavés
 Yagüe - On Loan From RCD Espanyol
 Iván Ania - On Loan From Cádiz CF
 Maikel - Signed From CD Tenerife
 Rueda - Signed From Águilas CF
 Javi Rodriguez - On Loan From Levante UD
 Juanpa - Signed From CD Numancia
 Israel - Signed From Córdoba CF
 Iker Begoña - Signed From Recreativo de Huelva
 Catalá - Signed From Albacete BalompiéOut Kiko - Transferred To Real Oviedo
 Chando - On Loan To Zamora CF
 Pinedo - Return To Cádiz C
 Aguilar - Transferred To CD La Unión
 Maldonado - Return To Real Betis
 Fernando Vega - Transferred To Real Betis
 Paco Jurado - Transferred To Calasparra FC
 Iñaki Bea  - Transferred To Real Valladolid
 Marc Bertran - Transferred To CD Tenerife
 Perona - On Loan To Levante B
 Iñaki Berruet - Transferred To Real Unión
 Velazquez - Return To Cádiz CF
 Facundo Sava - Transferred To Racing Club de Avellaneda

SD PonferradinaIn:  Daniel Cifuentes - On Loan From Real Sociedad
  Nabil Baha - Signed From US Créteil-Lusitanos
  David Ramírez - Signed From Olimpo de Bahía Blanca
  Jotha - Signed From Real Madrid Castilla
  Robles - Signed From Real Madrid Castilla
  Ignacio Risso - Signed From Quilmes Atlético Club
  Nacho - Signed From Racing de Ferrol
  Raponi - Signed From Instituto Atlético Central Córdoba
  Espasandín - On Loan From Real ValladolidOut:  Vicente Uriz - Transferred To CD Lugo
  Diego Ribera - Transferred To Orihuela CF
  Guillermo Escribano - On Loan To Osasuna B
  Alberto Garcia - Transferred To Mérida UD
  Pavone - Transferred To Logroñés CF
  Castilla - Transferred To UE Lleida
  Jose Antonio Soto - Transferred To CD Orientación Marítima

Real Madrid CastillaIn: Carlos Sanchez - Return From UD Almería
 Manuel Pérez - Signed From Córdoba CF
  Jeffrey Hoogervorst - Signed From Sporting de Gijón
 Dani Guillén - Graduated From Real Madrid C
 Esteban Granero - Graduated From Real Madrid C
 Rodri - Graduated From Real Madrid C
 Rayco - Graduated From Real Madrid C
 Santacruz - Graduated From Real Madrid C
 Torres - Graduated From Real Madrid C
 Thaer Fayed - Graduated From Real Madrid C
 Alberto Bueno  - Graduated From Real Madrid C
 Antonio Adán  - Graduated From Real Madrid C
 Adrián González - Graduated From Real Madrid C
 Pedro Mosquera  - Graduated From Real Madrid C
 Alberto Bueno  - Graduated From Real Madrid C
 Juan Mata - Graduated From Real Madrid C
 Javier Soria - Graduated From Real Madrid C
 Jonathan Ñíguez - Graduated From Real Madrid COut: Jeffrey Hoogervorst - Transferred To FC Barcelona
 Cobeño - Transferred To Sevilla FC
 Barral - Transferred To Sporting de Gijón
 Oscar Diaz - Transferred To Elche CF
 Carlos Sanchez - Transferred To CD Castellón
 Jotha - Transferred To SD Ponferradina
 Robles - Transferred To SD Ponferradina
 Adrián Martin - Transferred To Real Murcia
  Filipe Luis - Transferred To Deportivo de La Coruña
 Rubén González - Transferred To Racing de Santander
 Roberto Soldado - On Loan To CA Osasuna
 Álvaro Arbeloa - Transferred To Deportivo de La Coruña
 Jurado - Transferred To Atlético Madrid
 Javier Balboa - On Loan To Racing de Santander
 Ernesto Gómez - Transferred To Málaga CF

Real MurciaIn: Paco Lledó - On Loan From Real Valladolid
 Noel-Williams - Signed From Burnley F.C.
 Emerson de Andrade - Signed From AA Ponte Preta
 Bruno Herrero - On Loan From Sevilla FC
 Abel - Signed From' Malaga B
 Notario - Signed From Sevilla FC
 Paco Peña - Signed From Albacete Balompié
 Antoñito - On Loan From Sevilla FC
 Jofre - Signed From RCD Espanyol
 Ochoa - Signed From CD Numancia
 Gallardo - On Loan From Sevilla FC
 Adrian Martin - Signed From Real Madrid Castilla
 Aranda - Signed From Sevilla FC
 Ramón - Signed From Recreativo de Huelva
 Pablo Ruiz - On Loan From Sevilla FC

Out
 Jesus Tato - On Loan To UE Lleida
 Capi - On Loan To Lorca Deportiva CF
 Palacios - Transferred To Granada CF
 Hector Bueno - Transferred To Albacete Balompié
 Nacho Garro - Transferred To UD Las Palmas
 Urzelai - Transferred To UD Vecindario
 Julio Alvarez - Transferred To CD Numancia
 Pulido - Transferred To CD Numancia
 Carrera - Transferred To Argentinos Juniors
 Salgueiro - Transferred To Danubio F.C.
 Chalkias - Transferred To Aris Thessaloniki
 Pablo Sierra - Transferred To UE Lleida
 Sebastian Corona - On Loan To Águilas CF
 Markus Kreuz - Transferred To Kickers Offenbach
 Aureliano Torres - Transferred To Club 12 de Octubre
 Diego Alonso - Transferred To Club Nacional de Football

UD Salamanca

In:
 Alberto - Signed From Real Unión
 Gomes - On Loan From Real Sociedad B
 Jorge Pina - Signed From Málaga B
 Dani Lopez - Signed From Marino
 David Fas - Signed From Universidad de Las Palmas CF
 Dani Tortolero - Signed From Hércules CF
 Susaeta - On Loan From Real Sociedad B
 Tete - Signed From Xerez CD
 Carlos Vela  - On Loan From Celta de Vigo
 Braulio - On Loan From Atlético Madrid
 Roberto da Souza - On Loan From Celta de Vigo

Out:
 Abel Valenzuela - On Loan To CD Guijuelo
 Miku - Return To Valencia B
 Jose Luis Deus - Transferred To Terrassa FC
 Totti - On Loan To CD Guijuelo
 Angel Camaño - Transferred To Cultural y Deportiva Leonesa
 Victor Blanco - On Loan To CD Linares
 Jacobo Campos - Transferred To Real Oviedo
 Robert - On Loan To Zamora CF
 Koeman - On Loan To CF Palencia

CD Tenerife
In:
  Juvenal - Signed From Recreativo de Huelva
 Manolo Martinez - Signed From Gimnàstic de Tarragona
 Manuel Blanco - Signed From Sevilla FC
 Oscar Perez - Signed From Bolton Wanderers F.C.
 Castiñeiras - Signed From SD Eibar
 Raúl Sánchez - Signed From CD Castellón
 Marc Bertran - Signed From Lorca Deportiva CF
 Ruano - On Loan From Córdoba CF
 Suso - Signed From AD Laguna
 Pablo Sicilia - On Loan From Atlético Madrid
 Bernardo - On Loan From Deportivo Alavés
 Raul Navas - On Loan From Cádiz CF
 Clavero - Signed From CA Osasuna
 Culebras - Signed From Levante UD
 Sergio Torres - Signed From Atlético Madrid
 Tomasz Frankowski - On Loan From Wolverhampton Wanderers F.C.
Out
 Tomás Correa Miranda - On Loan To CF Badalona
 Juan Ramón Ruano - On Loan To Orihuela CF
 Andrés San Martín - Transferred To Arsenal de Sarandí
 Frantz Bertín - On Loan To Atlético Madrid B
 Kirian - Transferred To UD Vecindario
  Cristian Alvarez - Return To Racing de Santander
 Jesus Vazquez - Transferred To Recreativo de Huelva
 Edu Moya - Transferred To Recreativo de Huelva
 Maikel - Transferred To Lorca Deportiva CF
 Toni Moral - Return To Celta B
 Airam - Transferred To Lucena CF
 Cocito - Transferred To Real Murcia
 William - Return To Clube Atlético Paranaense
 Adolfo Baines - Transferred To Milton Keynes Dons F.C.
  Aaron Scheithe - On Loan To UD Lanzarote
 Kelemen - Transferred To UD Vecindario
 Toñito - Transferred To NK Rijeka
 Joao Paulo - Transferred To F.C. Paços de Ferreira
 Roberto Carlos - On Loan To Málaga B
 Cesar Belli - Transferred To Clube Atlético Paranaense
 Daniel Fagiani - Transferred To Talleres de Córdoba
 LaPaglia - On Loan To Vitória F.C.
 Almirón - Transferred To Club Atlético Lanús

Real Valladolid

In:
 Daniel Kome - Signed From RCD Mallorca
 Vladimir Manchev - On Loan From Levante UD
 Ikaki Bea - Signed From Lorca Deportiva CF
 de la Cuesta - On Loan From Cádiz CF
 Alvaro Rubio - Signed From Albacete Balompié
 Sisi - On Loan From Valencia CF
 Alberto - Signed From Real Sociedad
 Toché - On Loan From Atlético Madrid
 Borja Fernández - signed from  Real Madrid
 García Calvo - signed from  Atlético Madrid

Out
 Paco Lledó - On Loan To Real Murcia
 Diego Figueredo - On Loan To Godoy Cruz Antonio Tomba
 Roberto Losada - Transferred To UD Las Palmas
 Sousa - Transferred To Getafe CF
 Casar - Return To Racing de Santander
  Bizarri - Transferred To Gimnàstic de Tarragona
 Mario - Transferred To Recreativo de Huelva
 O.J. Morales - Transferred To Málaga CF
 Tote - Transferred To Hércules CF
 Ramis - Return To RCD Mallorca
 Carmona - Return To RCD Mallorca
 Robles - Transferred To Polideportivo Ejido
 Cristobal Carreño - Transferred To Mérida
 Teofilio García - On Loan To Cartagena

UD Vecindario

In:
 Carlos García - On Loan From Liverpool FC
 Garcia Granero - Signed From Xerez CD
 Nenad Mirosavljevic - On Loan From FK Partizan
 Sebastián Carrizo - On Loan From CA Independiente
 Mozer - Signed From C.D. Trofense
 Kirian - Signed From CD Tenerife
 Francisco Jiménez Tejada - On Loan From Deportivo de La Coruña
 Markel Bergara - On Loan From Real Sociedad
 Verdejo - Signed From Hércules CF
 Javier Morales - On Loan From Club Atlético Lanús
 Abdulrazak Ekpoki - Signed From Gimnàstic de Tarragona
 Marián Kelemen - Signed From CD Tenerife

Out:
 Jon Urzelai - Transferred To SD Eibar
 Iván Carril - Return To Deportivo de La Coruña
 Ángel Guirado - Return To Deportivo de La Coruña
 Sergio Villanueva - Transferred To Real Oviedo
 Roberto Alvarez - Transferred To Alicante CF
 Jeffrey Martin - On Loan To UD Villa de Santa Brígida
 Abraham - On Loan To CD Orientación Marítima
 Iván Martín - On Loan To Universidad de Las Palmas CF
 Jesús Abrante - On Loan To UD Fuerteventura

Xerez CD
In:
 Walter López - Signed From River Plate
 Gonzalo del Bono - On Loan From Atlético de Rafaela
 Abel Aguilar - On Loan From Udinese
 Jorge Luque - Signed From Alicante
 Chema - Signed From Alicante
 Yordi - Signed From Mallorca
 Marcos Navas - On Loan From Sevilla B
 David Prieto - On Loan From Sevilla B

Out
 Gonzalo del Bono - Return To Atlético de Rafaela
 García Granero - Transferred To UD Vecindario
 Alex Fernández - Released
 Selu - Transferred To Orihuela
 Rubén Pazos - Transferred To Zamora CF
 Alex Colorado - On Loan To Granada
 Iván Rosado - Return To Osasuna
 Alberto Soria - Transferred To Playas de Jandía
 Guzmán Casaseca - On Loan To Córdoba
 Tete - Transferred To Salamanca
 Guille Escribano - Transferred To Ponferradina
 Aurelio - Transferred To Castellón
 Mikel Etxabe - Transferred To Eibar
 Sergio Narvaez - On Loan To Ceuta
 Dani Pendín - Transferred To Castellón

2006-07
Tran
Spain
Spain